Otto Schindler (1906–1959) was a German zoologist who specialised in ichthyology.

In 1931 he joined the Bavarian State Collection of Zoology (Zoologische Staatssammlung München) as an assistant curator of ichthyology, to work on the specimens collected by the III German Grand Chaco Expedition to East Paraguay. In 1937 he joined the IV expedition to Brazil which lasted 6 months. After the Second World War he was appointed Curator of Ichthyology and restored and ordered the collection of fish which had survived the war. It is known that he visited Stockholm in the 1950s, bringing some specimens from the museums there back to Munich. He also obtained specimens from Vienna as part of his efforts to rebuild the ZSM collection. He returned to South America in 1953-54, travelling to Bolivia with Walter Forster; during this expedition Schindler was appointed to negotiate the fishing quotas on Lake Titicaca with Peru by the Bolivian Ministry of Agriculture; the Peruvian negotiator was another German, Hans Wilhem Koepcke. He collected many specimens from Lake Titicaca and he sampled in the vicinity of Cochabamba and in the Amazon lowlands with the amateur entomologist Rudolf Zischka. During the expeditions he collected the types of Aphyocharacidium bolivianum, Oligosarcus schindleri and Characidium schindleri. Schindler has the goby genus Schindleria named after him. He described the type species as Hemipramphus praematurus and Louis Pierre Giltay raised the genus Schindleria for this distinctive fish in 1934.

References

20th-century German zoologists
German ichthyologists
1906 births
1959 deaths